Orana may refer to:

In fiction

Orana, a fictional character appearing in Wonder Woman comics and the DC Universe

In science and nature

Orana (moth), a genus of moths in the subfamily Lymantriinae
Adoxophyes orana, the summer fruit tortrix, a moth of the family Tortricidae

In geography

Orana (New South Wales), a region in Australia
Orana, Western Australia, a suburb of Albany
Orana School, a Steinerist school in Canberra, Australian Capital Territory
Orana Wildlife Park, New Zealand's only open-range zoo
Campbelltown Stadium in Campbelltown, New South Wales, formerly known as Orana Park

See also
 Oranda (disambiguation)